Caumontisphinctes is an ammonoid genus from the ammonitid superfamily Perkinsonatoidea that lived during the Bajocian stage of the Middle Jurassic.

Chaumontisphinctis, named by Buckman, is like the genus Perisphinctis in being compressed with an ovoid whorl section but perkinsoniid in having sharp ribbing, a smooth or grooved venter,  and tubercles commonly developed at bifurcation points on the ribs and at the ventral edge or on the venter.

References

 Treatise on Invertebrate Paleontology, Part L Ammonoidea (L309); Geological Society of America and Univ of Kansas press, 5th printing, 1990

Jurassic ammonites
Fossils of France
Bajocian life
Ammonitida genera
Perisphinctoidea